Below are the rosters for the 2001 UEFA European Under-16 Football Championship tournament in England.

Group A

Head coach: Patrick Klinkenberg

Head coach: Klaus Sammer

Head coach: Vasile Aelenei

Head coach: Juan Santisteban

Group B

Head coach: Ruud Kaiser

Head coach: Krzysztof Słabik

Head coach: Yuri Smirnov

Head coach: Gündüz Tekin Onay

Group C

Head coach: Dick Bate

Head coach: Mihály Ubrankovics

Head coach: Paolo Berrettini

Caps as of before the start of the tournament

Head coach:

Group D

Head coach: Martin Novoselac

Head coach: Timo Liekoski

Head coach: Jean-François Jodar

Head coach: Ross Mathie

Notes

References

UEFA European Under-17 Championship squads